Pag cheese or Pag Island cheese is a Croatian variety of hard, distinctively flavored sheep milk cheese originating from the Adriatic island of Pag. It is generally regarded as the most famous of all artisan cheeses made in the country and can be found in many markets outside Croatia.

History
In 1774, the travel writer Alberto Fortis, on his way to Dalmatia, wrote about Pag island's products, including sea salt, sage honey, wool and Pag cheese. Until early in the 20th century, the inhabitants of Pag had their own dry stone huts in which they milked the sheep and made Pag cheese. These stone houses are adorned in sedge and reeds from the nearby fields, the huts were built out of town on the rocky hills above the pastures. The majority of the pastures are located on the hilly parts of the island and are recognizable by the dry stone walls that surround them. From far off, the intricate stone walls resemble the famous Pag lace (paška čipka) as they traverse the rocky summits. Historically, there was no private ownership of the pastures and the sheep freely grazed on all the land. 

Over time, the pastures slowly became privately owned, so the shepherds moved back into towns and their stone huts became pasture homes. As shepherds commuted to and from pastures to care for their sheep, the women assumed the role of cheese makers. Pag cheese slowly but surely gained importance not only as a food for the locals but also as a commodity to market across Croatia, thus Pag cheese became an important source of income for the villagers.

Production process
The island of Pag has a long tradition of cheese making and agriculture and is the most indented island in the Adriatic, which provides perfect conditions for making cheese. The island of Pag's eastern landscape is dominated by the mountain range on the mainland, Velebit.  It is on these snowy peaks that hot and cold air amasses, and particularly in winter, gives birth to the Pag Bora. A strong, cool, dry wind that gathers strength as it tumbles down the southern slopes of Velebit onto the calm seas. The Bora then dries and turns into dry salt dust, which it then scatters all over Pag, turning it into a white, salty island.  and in these conditions upon the rocky hills of Pag, only the extremely resilient and aromatic plant species survive. The best known and most precious is the fragrant Pag's Sage, there are numerous colonies of this purple flowered plant which adorn the pure white limestone in May, and fill the air with its scent.

It is upon such salty and aromatic vegetation that Pag's autochthonous breed of sheep graze freely, giving local sheep unique qualities and taste in their milk which then permeate the taste of Pag cheese.

Certification
The main producers of Pag cheese came together to form an association with the aim of obtaining Protected Designation of Origin for Pag cheese. The European Commission has granted the designation on 25 November 2019. PDO imposes strict conditions of production techniques as well as a particular origin of base products which will ensure that Pag cheese remains a product of Pag.

References

External links
 "Paški Sir Cheese", Foodista, July 9, 2011
 "Sirana Gligora"
 "The joy of Paški sir", Hudin.com, July 11, 2011
 Paška sirana

Sheep's-milk cheeses
Croatian cheeses
Croatian cuisine
Pag (island)